John Wilson Cassingham (June 22, 1840 – March 14, 1930) was a U.S. Representative from Ohio for two terms from 1901 to 1905.

Early life and career
Born in Coshocton, Ohio, Cassingham attended the public schools.
Deputy county treasurer 1857-1868.
He engaged in the mercantile business from 1868 to 1875 and in the mining of coal in 1875.
Later also engaged in the manufacture of paper and in banking.
County auditor 1880-1887.
Trustee of the public library of Coshocton.
He served as member of the board of education.
He served as president of the Coshocton Board of Trade.
He served as delegate to the Democratic National Convention in 1896.

Congress
Cassingham was elected as a Democrat to the Fifty-seventh and Fifty-eighth Congresses (March 4, 1901 – March 3, 1905).
He declined to be a candidate for reelection in 1904 to the Fifty-ninth Congress.

Retirement and death 
Reengaged in his former business interests in Coshocton until 1915, when he retired from active pursuits.

He died in Coshocton on March 14, 1930, and was interred in South Lawn Cemetery.

Sources

1840 births
1930 deaths
People from Coshocton, Ohio
Democratic Party members of the United States House of Representatives from Ohio
American coal miners